The 1998 Pro Bowl was the NFL's all-star game for the 1997 season. The game was played on February 1, 1998, at Aloha Stadium in Honolulu, Hawaii. The final score was AFC 29, NFC 24. Warren Moon of the Seattle Seahawks, invited to participate because of an injury to John Elway, was the game's MVP. The referee was Gary Lane. The halftime show was Montell Jordan.

AFC

Quarterbacks
John Elway – Denver Broncos (Injured, did not play)
Drew Bledsoe – New England Patriots
Mark Brunell – Jacksonville Jaguars
Warren Moon – Seattle Seahawks (injury replacement)

Running backs
Terrell Davis – Denver Broncos
Jerome Bettis – Pittsburgh Steelers
Kimble Anders – Kansas City Chiefs
Eddie George – Tennessee Oilers

Wide receivers
Tim Brown – Oakland Raiders
Yancey Thigpen – Pittsburgh Steelers
Andre Rison – Kansas City Chiefs
Jimmy Smith – Jacksonville Jaguars
Eric Metcalf - San Diego Chargers (Return Specialist)

Tight ends
Ben Coates – New England Patriots
Shannon Sharpe – Denver Broncos

Offensive linemen
Tony Boselli – Jacksonville Jaguars
Ruben Brown – Buffalo Bills
Dermontti Dawson – Pittsburgh Steelers
Bruce Armstrong – New England Patriots
Bruce Matthews – Tennessee Oilers (injured, did not play)
Tom Nalen – Denver Broncos
Jonathan Ogden – Baltimore Ravens
Steve Wisniewski- Oakland Raiders (injury replacement)
Will Shields – Kansas City Chiefs

Defensive linemen
Tim Bowens – Miami Dolphins
Michael McCrary – Baltimore Ravens
Darrell Russell – Oakland Raiders
Michael Sinclair – Seattle Seahawks
Bruce Smith – Buffalo Bills
Ted Washington – Buffalo Bills

Linebackers
Mo Lewis – New York Jets
Ray Lewis – Baltimore Ravens
Junior Seau – San Diego Chargers
Derrick Thomas - Kansas City Chiefs
Chris Slade - New England Patriots
Levon Kirkland - Pittsburgh Steelers

Defensive backs
*Ty Law – New England Patriots
Lawyer Milloy – New England Patriots
Darryl Williams – Seattle Seahawks
Carnell Lake - Pittsburgh Steelers
James Hasty - Kansas City Chiefs

Kicker
Mike Hollis - Jacksonville Jaguars

Punter
Bryan Barker - Jacksonville Jaguars

NFC

Quarterbacks
Brett Favre – Green Bay Packers (injured – did not play)
Chris Chandler – Atlanta Falcons (injury replacement)
Steve Young – San Francisco 49ers
Trent Dilfer – Tampa Bay Buccaneers

Running backs
Mike Alstott – Tampa Bay Buccaneers
Warrick Dunn – Tampa Bay Buccaneers
Dorsey Levens – Green Bay Packers
Barry Sanders – Detroit Lions
Travis Jervey - Green Bay Packers (Special Teamer)
Michael Bates - Carolina Panthers (Return Specialist)

Wide receivers
Herman Moore – Detroit Lions
Cris Carter – Minnesota Vikings
Irving Fryar – Philadelphia Eagles
Rob Moore – Arizona Cardinals

Tight ends
Mark Chmura – Green Bay Packers
Wesley Walls – Carolina Panthers

Offensive linemen
Larry Allen – Dallas Cowboys
Jeff Christy – Minnesota Vikings
Kevin Gogan – San Francisco 49ers
Randall McDaniel – Minnesota Vikings
William Roaf – New Orleans Saints
Todd Steussie – Minnesota Vikings
Tony Mayberry – Tampa Bay Buccaneers
Nate Newton – Dallas Cowboys

Defensive linemen
Warren Sapp – Tampa Bay Buccaneers
Michael Strahan – New York Giants
Kevin Carter – St. Louis Rams
Robert Porcher – Detroit Lions
Luther Ellis – Detroit Lions
Dana Stubblefield – San Francisco 49ers
John Randle – Minnesota Vikings

Linebackers
Jessie Armstead – New York Giants
Derrick Brooks – Tampa Bay Buccaneers
Hardy Nickerson – Tampa Bay Buccaneers
Jessie Tuggle – Atlanta Falcons
Ken Norton Jr. - San Francisco 49ers
Lee Woodall - San Francisco 49ers

Defensive backs
Merton Hanks - San Francisco 49ers
LeRoy Butler – Green Bay Packers
John Lynch – Tampa Bay Buccaneers
Deion Sanders – Dallas Cowboys (did not play)
Aeneas Williams – Arizona Cardinals
Darren Woodson – Dallas Cowboys (injured, did not play)

Kicker
Jason Hanson - Detroit Lions

Punter
Matt Turk - Washington Redskins

References

External links
 1997 Pro Bowl recap at ProBowlOnline.com

Pro Bowl
Pro Bowl
Pro Bowl
Pro Bowl
Pro Bowl
American football competitions in Honolulu
February 1998 sports events in the United States